is a Japanese politician of the Tomorrow Party of Japan and former member of the House of Representatives in the Diet (national legislature), representing the Saitama No. 10 District.

Matsuzaki studied law at the University of Tokyo and received an MA from Harvard University in the USA. He was elected for the first time in 2003.

Works
 Jiminto Seiken by Seizaburo Sato, Tetsuhisa Matsuzaki, Chuo Koronsha,  (4-12-001477-0)

References

External links
  
 Official DPJ profile 

Members of the House of Representatives (Japan)
University of Tokyo alumni
Living people
1950 births
People from Tokyo
Democratic Party of Japan politicians
Harvard University alumni
21st-century Japanese politicians